Gorg Taj (also Romanized as Gorg Tāj) is a village in Peyrajeh Rural District, in the Central District of Neka County, Mazandaran Province, Iran. At the 2006 census, its population was 62, in 17 families.

References 

Populated places in Neka County